The glacier flea (Desoria saltans, sometimes also Isotoma saltans) is a species of springtail. D. saltans is the common glacier flea, but there are several springtail species that are also called glacier fleas, and which catch the attention on snow surfaces due to their dark body colouring, their hopping motion and the fact that they often gather in large groups. These include, for example, Desoria nivalis (formerly also: Isotoma pseudomaritima) or Vertagopus alpinus.

D. saltans is 1.5 – 2.5 millimetres long and lives on the glaciers and snowfields of the Alps, where it feeds on substances such as cryoconite, pollen and plant remains and snow algae of the genus Chlamydomonas. The jet black animal is easy to spot on light backgrounds and gathers in great numbers on surfaces during the melt season. 


See also 
 Snow flea
 Boreus hyemalis, also known as the snow flea or snow scorpionfly

References

Literature 
 Eduard Handschin (1924): Die Collembolenfauna des Schweizerischen Nationalparks. Denkschriften der Schweizerischen Naturforschenden Gesellschaft 60: 89-174. 
 Mikhail Potapov (2001): Synopses on Palearctic Collembola Part III: Isotomidae. Abhandlungen und Berichte des Naturkundemuseums Görlitz 73: 1-603.

External links 
 BERGE ERLEBEN - Enzyklopädie: Gletscherfloh (Isotoma saltans)
 Kleiner Held im ewigen Eis - Ein kurzes Portrait des Gletscherflohs (die PDF-Version enthält Bilder)

Collembola
Arthropods of Europe
Animals described in 1841